State Road 5 (NM 5) was a state highway in the US state of New Mexico. NM 5's western terminus was in Puye, and the eastern terminus was at NM 30 near Santa Clara Pueblo. It was established in the early-1930s and was removed from the state highway system in 2000 and became Indian Route 601.

Major intersections

References

Former state highways in New Mexico